Willie L. Howard (born December 26, 1977) is a former American football defensive end in the National Football League. He was drafted by the Minnesota Vikings in the second round of the 2001 NFL Draft and played for them for two seasons before a serious injury ended his career. He played college football for Stanford Cardinal.

He was named the head football coach at Robbinsdale Cooper High School in 2010, and he is also the dean of students.

References

1977 births
Living people
American football defensive ends
Minnesota Vikings players
People from Mountain View, California
Players of American football from California
Sportspeople from Santa Clara County, California
Stanford Cardinal football players